The Asse is a  long river in the Alpes-de-Haute-Provence département, southeastern France. It flows generally southwest.

The Asse is called "Asse de Clumanc" between its source and its confluence with the "Asse de Blieux" and the "Asse de Moriez" at Barrême. The valleys of the Asse and its tributaries are protected as a Natura 2000 site.

Part of the Asse valley is used by the route Napoléon.

Communes along its course
This list is ordered from source to mouth: Tartonne, Clumanc, Saint-Lions, Barrême, Chaudon-Norante, Beynes, Entrages, Châteauredon, Mézel, Estoublon, Bras-d'Asse, Saint-Julien-d'Asse, Brunet, Le Castellet, Valensole, Oraison

References

Rivers of France
Rivers of Alpes-de-Haute-Provence
Rivers of Provence-Alpes-Côte d'Azur
Braided rivers in France